István Sárkány (5 August 1913 – 27 November 2009) was a Hungarian Olympic gymnast, Olympic judge, gymnastics coach and official. Sárkány represented Hungary at the 1936 Berlin Summer Olympics at the age of 22. He participated in all men's gymnastic events with highs of 29th in the Rings and 31st in the Vault competitions.  He placed 64th in the Men's All-around competition.

His personal gymnastics career was impacted by World War II as the 1940 and 1944 Olympic Games were canceled due to the war.

The war and Nazi rule impacted Sárkány's personal life as well with his first marriage to friend and fellow gymnast, Ágnes Keleti.  A Jew, Keleti had heard a rumor that married women were not taken to labor camps so she hastily married Sárkány in 1944. They divorced in 1950 after the war ended. Keleti went on to Olympic fame winning 10 total medals during the 1952 Helsinki and 1956 Melbourne games. She remains one of the most decorated Olympic athletes of all time. She is regarded as the top Jewish female athlete in Olympic history. Despite an injury that kept her from participating in the 1948 London games. Keleti received an 11th medal when the Hungarian women's team earned a silver in the all-around competition.

Sárkány is most noted for his highly regarded and lengthy career as a Hungarian national and world gymnastics judge. He is noted in the official Olympic Game reports as judging the 1952 Helsinki Games Horizontal Bar competitions, the 1956 Melbourne Games (no specific apparatus), 1960 Rome Games Long Horse competitions and 1964 Tokyo Games Horizontal Bars competitions. Olympic reports no longer listed individual judges after 1964 but he is believed to have judged the 1968 Mexico City and 1972 Munich games as well.

Sárkány is honored in Hungarian gymnastics and sports hall of fames for his years of service.

He is also featured in Hungarian sport documentaries, most notably on the 1956 Melbourne Olympic Summer Games. That Olympics was noted for the famous "Blood in the Water match" in water polo between Hungary and Russia as well as numerous Hungarian Olympic athletes that sought asylum rather than return to Hungary under Russian rule. Some athletes stayed in Australia. Others were welcomed in the United States and toured the country under a Sports Illustrated sponsored tour. Ágnes Keleti sought asylum and emigrated to Israel (she returned to Hungary  later.) Istvan returned to Hungary to continue his storied judging and officiating career.

Sárkány's obituary highlights his contributions to Hungarian and Olympic gymnastics.

References

1913 births
2009 deaths
Hungarian male artistic gymnasts
Olympic gymnasts of Hungary
Gymnasts at the 1936 Summer Olympics